Diego de Muros (died 18 August 1525) was a Roman Catholic prelate who served as Bishop of Oviedo (1512–1525) and Bishop of Mondoñedo (1505–1512). He was one of three bishops of Spain who served contemporaneously, the others being Diego de Muros (Bishop of Islas Canarias) and Diego de Muros (bishop of Ciudad Rodrigo).

Biography
On 4 April 1505, Diego de Muros was appointed during the papacy of Pope Julius II as Bishop of Mondoñedo. On 1 October 1512, Diego de Muros was appointed during the papacy of Pope Julius II as Bishop of Oviedo. He served as Bishop of Oviedo until his death on 18 August 1525.

See also 
Diego de Muros (Bishop of Islas Canarias)
Diego de Muros (bishop of Ciudad Rodrigo)

References

External links and additional sources
 (for Chronology of Bishops) 
 (for Chronology of Bishops) 
 (for Chronology of Bishops) 
 (for Chronology of Bishops) 

16th-century Roman Catholic bishops in Spain
Bishops appointed by Pope Julius II
1525 deaths